Pellionia is a genus of flowering plants in the family Urticaceae. The flowers of Pellionia are white globules held on stalks above the plant, which respond to changes in temperature by releasing their pollen as little puffs of smoke.

References

Urticaceae
Urticaceae genera